Lodovico Sergardi (b. at Siena, 1660; d. at Spoleto, 7 November 1726) was an Italian Roman Catholic priest and poet, chiefly known for his vivid latin satires against the jurist Giovanni Vincenzo Gravina, models of composition, which for nearly a decade kept the Roman public in an uproar.

Biography 

Sergardi was born at Siena on 27 March 1660. As a youth he studied painting, literature, and philosophy, and showed a passionate inclination toward poetry. In October 1684 he went to Rome to study jurisprudence. Soon after his arrival at Rome he began to make acquaintances among the literati of the city, and soon became the protégé of Prince Chigi. He befriended cardinal Pietro Ottoboni, and served him as Prefect of St. Peter's Basilica when he was elected pope as Alexander VIII in 1689. An active member of the Republic of Letters, Sergardi soon became friends with such eminent scholars as Jean Mabillon and Francesco Bianchini, the keeper of the Ottoboni Library. In 1691 Sergardi became a member of the Academy of Arcadia under the pseudonym of  “Licone”. During the seances of the Academy, Sergardi began a spirited debate with the famed jurist Giovanni Vincenzo Gravina. The hatred between them soon split the academy into supporting factions. Sergardi attacked Gravina in a series of bitter latin satires published under the pseudonym of Quintus Sectanus (1694). Sergardi's satires appeared in five editions between 1694 and 1701. They have the force, the poetical expression, and the freedom or, rather, licentiousness, of Juvenal. The Satires were translated into Terza rima as it is believed by the author himself. The latter part of the fourteenth is particularly fine. The Spanish scholar Manuel Martí published his Satyromastix in defence of Gravina.

Sergardi died in Spoleto in November 1726.

References

Bibliography 

 Amedeo Quondam, Le satire di Ludovico Sergardi. Contributo ad una storia della cultura romana tra Sei e Settecento, in «La Rassegna della letteratura italiana» LXIII (1969), pp. 206-272
 
 The Satires of Lodovico Sergardi. An English Translation and Introduction by Ronald E. Pepin (Seventeenth-Century Texts and Studies 4) (New York, San Francisco, Bern, etc., 1994), Introduction pp. 1–13 and notes to each of the fourteen satires.

External links
 

Italian poets
Italian male poets
1660 births
1726 deaths
Writers from Siena
17th-century Latin-language writers
17th-century Italian poets
Italian Latinists
Latin-language writers from Italy
Members of the Academy of Arcadians